R U Still Down? (Remember Me) is the sixth studio album and second double album by American rapper, 2Pac, released on November 25, 1997. It is his second posthumous release and the first to be released without his creative input and contains previously unreleased material from the time period of his albums Strictly 4 My N.I.G.G.A.Z., Thug Life: Volume 1 and Me Against the World. Throughout the album, 2Pac airs his views on life from a time before he became involved in the controversial East Coast–West Coast rivalry. His lyrics foreshadow his death in songs like "Open Fire", "Thug Style" and "Only Fear of Death." The album spawned two hits, "Do for Love" and "I Wonder If Heaven Got a Ghetto", of which "Do for Love" was certified Gold by the RIAA. R U Still Down? (Remember Me) sold 549,000 copies in its first week,  reached multi-Platinum status (4 million sold) in under a month, and topped the R&B charts in the United States for three weeks.

Background

The album was the first to be released from 2Pac's mother's imprint, Amaru Entertainment and features almost all previously unreleased material, all of which was recorded between 1992 and 1994. Of the material previously released is: "Definition of a Thug Nigga"; previously released on the 1993 soundtrack Poetic Justice (soundtrack). Two retitled remixes of "I Wonder If Heaven's Got A Ghetto"; first released as a B-side to the 1993 single "Keep Ya Head Up". "I'm Getting Money"; although technically unreleased, features the same lyrics as the 1994 song "Str8 Ballin', only with the words, "Straight ballin, being replaced with the words, "I'm gettin' money."

The album's production was overseen by the mysterious producer(s), We Got Kidz Productions; producing entirely new instrumentals for numerous songs, adding new production to various original instrumentals and serving as the album's executive producer, alongside Afeni Shakur and Lisa Smith-Putnam. Other producers hired to create new music for the album were QDIII, Soulshock & Karlin, Mike Mosley, and Ricky Rouse (in partnership with We Got Kidz Productions).

R U Still Down? was the name of several handwritten track lists 2Pac had written in 1993 and 1994 that featured both, unreleased songs and songs that would later be issued on Me Against The World and Thug Life: Volume 1. Interscope Records originally planned to release an album under the same name in December 1995, during 2Pac's imprisonment. With no new material being able to be recorded, like R U Still Down? (Remember Me), the album was to feature unused songs from his previous three albums, Strictly 4 My N.I.G.G.A.Z., Thug Life: Volume 1 and Me Against the World. However, this version was never released due to 2Pac's early release from prison, by virtue of signing to Death Row Records.

Two more unreleased songs from this period of 2Pac's career, "Changes" and "God Bless the Dead", were released the following year on the next posthumous release, Greatest Hits. This period of 2Pac's career would then go unexplored until the release of the 2003 song "Runnin' (Dying to Live)", which was followed by the 2004 album Loyal to the Game, all of which was recorded during this same period.

Critical reception

"As always, there's ample self-destructive bullshit," noted Spin, "but as a whole the album's eerie and undeniable."
Matt Diehl of Entertainment Weekly give a mixed review, observing how "many of the 26 tracks are barely demo-worthy gangsta pap ... Still, 2Pac's raw talent burns through when his voice goes hoarse with rage [and] his blend of charismatic confidence and Travis Bickle paranoia is a bittersweet reminder of a gifted yet contradictory artist lost in the rap wars."

Track listing
Credits adapted from the album's liner notes.

Notes
 signifies a co-producer
 signifies an additional producer
 signifies the original producer

Samples
Definition of a Thug Nigga
"Brother's Gonna Work It Out" by Willie Hutch
"Ashley's Roachclip" by The Soul Searchers
"Wind Parade" by Donald Byrd
" Nuthin but a G' Thang (freestyle Remix) by Snoop Doggy Dogg and Dr. Dre
Ready 4 Whatever
"1980" by Gil Scott-Heron
R U Still Down (Remember Me)
"He's a Fly Guy" by Curtis Mayfield
Hellrazor
"Free 'Em All" by J-Flexx
Do for Love
"What You Won't Do for Love" by Bobby Caldwell
F*** All Y'all
"Street Life" by Geto Boys
I Wonder if Heaven Got a Ghetto (hip hop version/single release)
"Two of Us" by Cameo
Let Them Thangs Go
"Flash Light" by Parliament
Nothin' but Love
"Something About That Woman" by Lakeside
Nothing to Lose
"The Grand Finale" by The D.O.C.
"Us" by Ice Cube
"I Wanna Hold On to You" by Mica Paris
When I Get Free II
"Synthetic Substitution" by Melvin Bliss
"Concerto for Jazz/Rock Orchestra, Part I" by Stanley Clarke
Where Do We Go From Here
"May the Force Be With You" by Bootsy's Rubber Band
Black Starry Night (Interlude)
"Do It Roger" by Roger
I Wonder if Heaven Got a Ghetto (OG remake version)
"Do It Roger" by Roger
Lie to Kick It
"Funky President" by James Brown
"Haboglabotribin by Bernard Wright
Only Fear of Death
"Hihache" by Lafayette Afro Rock Band

Cultural references
On his 2008 album, Untitled, Nas sampled "I Wonder If Heaven Got a Ghetto" on his song, "Black President". 
On his verse from Tyler, The Creator’s song Smuckers Kanye West raps “I dreamt of 2Pac, he asked me “Are you still down?” Yeah, my nigga”.

Charts

Weekly charts

Year-end charts

Certifications

See also
List of number-one R&B albums of 1997 (U.S.)
List of number-one R&B albums of 1998 (U.S.)

References

1997 albums
Tupac Shakur albums
Jive Records albums
Albums produced by Laylaw
Albums produced by Def Jef
Amaru Entertainment albums
Albums produced by Warren G
Albums published posthumously
Albums produced by Johnny "J"
Albums produced by Live Squad
Albums produced by Afeni Shakur
Albums produced by Quincy Jones III
Albums produced by Soulshock and Karlin